New London is an unincorporated community in Frederick County, Maryland, United States. Thomas Maynard House was listed on the National Register of Historic Places in 1979.

References

Unincorporated communities in Frederick County, Maryland
Unincorporated communities in Maryland